Federal Yugoslavia may refer to:

Federal People's Republic of Yugoslavia, from 1945 to 1963
Federal Republic of Yugoslavia, the name of Serbia and Montenegro from 1992 to 2003